Grace Episcopal Church is a historic Episcopal church located at 404 Washington Avenue in Weldon, Halifax County, North Carolina.  It was built between 1872 and 1889, and is a rectangular Gothic Revival style stuccoed brick building. It has a steep gable roof, three-stage bell tower, two-stage buttress with capped pinnacle, and lancet windows.

It was listed on the National Register of Historic Places in 1991.

References

Episcopal church buildings in North Carolina
Churches on the National Register of Historic Places in North Carolina
Gothic Revival church buildings in North Carolina
Churches completed in 1889
19th-century Episcopal church buildings
Churches in Halifax County, North Carolina
National Register of Historic Places in Halifax County, North Carolina